Gaye is a commune of the Marne département in France.

Gaye may also refer to:

People
People with the given name Gaye:

Gaye Adegbalola (born 1944), guitarist, teacher, lecturer, activist, and photographer
Gaye Advert (born 1956), English punk rock musician
Gaye Dell (born 1948), Australian athlete, author, and artist
Gaye Porteous (born 1965), former field hockey player
Gaye Rennie (born 1949), Playboy Playmate
Gaye Stewart (1923–2010), professional ice hockey forward
Gaye Symington (born 1954), Speaker of the Vermont House of Representatives
Gaye Teede (born 1946), Australian netball player and coach

People with the surname Gaye:

Ali Gaye (born 1998), American football player
Anna Gordy Gaye (1922–2014), American songwriter
Babacar Gaye, Force Commander for the United Nations Organization Mission in the Democratic Republic of the Congo
Frankie Gaye (1941–2001), soul singer
Gregory Gaye (1900–1993), Russian actor
Janis Gaye (born 1956), singer and actress
Lisa Gaye (1935–2016), American actress, singer and dancer
Mara Gaye (1920–2005), American dancer
Marvin Gaye (1939–1984), American singer, songwriter, composer, multi-instrumentalist, and record producer
Musa Gibril Bala Gaye (born 1946), Gambian politician, economist, banker and diplomat
Nona Gaye, American singer, former fashion model, and screen actress
 Omar Gaye

Other
Gaye (song), a 1973 song by English singer-songwriter Clifford T. Ward from the album Home Thoughts

See also

Gay (disambiguation)

Gambian surnames